The 1994 National Soccer League was the tenth edition of the NSL First Division in South Africa. It was won by Orlando Pirates.

References

1994